The Naga River (Central Bicol: Salog Naga) is a river in Naga City, Philippines. It is an extension of the Bicol River.

Naga River Day
The first Naga River Day, dubbed Aldaw kan Salog nin Buhay (Day of River's Life), was celebrated on March 8, 2014, in the city of Naga. The event was established through Mayoral Proclamation No. 2014-002 which declares every second Saturday of March as Naga River Day. Its aim is to highlight the importance of the Naga River, particularly its role in the history and culture of the city. It also seeks to encourage Naga citizens to take responsibility for the river's cleanliness.

References

External links
 Naga City celebrates Naga River Day - Politiko Bicol/MIMAROPA
 Naga watershed

Rivers of the Philippines

Naga River